General Sir Henry Robert Ferguson Davie, 1st Baronet DL (1797 – 30 November 1885), known as Henry Ferguson until 1846, of Creedy Park, Sandford, Devon, was Liberal Member of Parliament for Haddington in East Lothian, Scotland, 1847 to 1878 and an army officer.

The son of Robert Ferguson, Fife, he joined the British Army in 1818. He rose through the ranks as follows: Lieutenant (1819), Captain (1822), Major (1826), Lieutenant Colonel (1828), Colonel (1841), Major General (1854), Lieutenant General (1860) and General (1866).

He was appointed Colonel of the 73rd (Perthshire) Regiment of Foot on 17 February 1865. The Regiment became the second Battalion, The Black Watch in 1881, and the General served as Colonel of the Battalion until his death.

In 1823, he married Frances Juliana Davie, daughter of Sir John Davie, 9th Baronet, of Creedy, and niece and heiress of Sir Humphrey Davie, 10th and last Baronet, of Creedy. In 1846 he assumed by Royal licence the additional surname of Davie and the following year the baronetcy held by his wife's family was revived when he was created a Baronet, of Creedy in the County of Devon.
on 9 January 1847.

He had six children, amongst whom John (born 1830), a Grenadier Guards officer, succeeded to the Baronetcy in 1885 and Charles Robert (born 1836) was Rector of Yelverton, Norfolk.

He was a Deputy Lieutenant of Devonshire and Somerset and lived at Creedy Park in Crediton, Devon.

References

Debretts Illustrated Baronetage, with the Knightage, 1876, Dean & Son (London), 1876

1797 births
Baronets in the Baronetage of the United Kingdom
Members of the Parliament of the United Kingdom for Scottish constituencies
British Army generals
73rd Regiment of Foot officers
People associated with East Lothian
UK MPs 1847–1852
UK MPs 1852–1857
UK MPs 1857–1859
UK MPs 1859–1865
UK MPs 1865–1868
UK MPs 1868–1874
UK MPs 1874–1880
Deputy Lieutenants of Devon
9th Queen's Royal Lancers officers
Grenadier Guards officers
People from Crediton
1885 deaths